The American Heavyweight Wrestling Championship was the first heavyweight professional wrestling championship in the United States. The title existed from 1881 through approximately 1922.

Title history

See also

Professional wrestling in the United States
Early wrestling championships
World Catch-as-Catch-Can Championship
World Greco-Roman Heavyweight Championship

References

External links 
 American Heavyweight title history at Wrestling-Titles.com

Heavyweight wrestling championships
National professional wrestling championships